Frances Ferris Yerxa Hamling (September 23, 1917 – March 3, 2019), also known as Frances Deegan, was an American science fiction writer and editor.

Early life 
Frances Ferris was born in Onondaga, Michigan, the daughter of Harry Longley Ferris and Ora M. Sherd Ferris. She graduated from high school in 1935.

Career 
Frances Yerxa wrote essays and science fiction, under various bylines. She also assisted her second husband in editing pulp magazines. She was managing editor of the magazines Imagination and Imaginative Tales from 1953 to 1958, and executive editor of Rogue, a men's magazine. As an officer of Greenleaf Publishing, she was a co-defendant with her husband in 1965, when the company was charged with copyright infringement. In 1976, her ex-husband Hamling served several months in prison for publishing obscene works.

Stories by Deegan/Yerxa include "The Martian and the Milkmaid" (Fantastic Adventures 1944), "The Radiant Rock" (Amazing Stories 1945), "Everybody Wants My Money" (Mammoth Detective 1946), "Little Drops of Water" (Amazing Stories 1946), "The Third Bolt" (Amazing Stories 1947), "Negative Problem" (Amazing Stories 1947), "One More Spring" (Amazing Stories 1947), "Bonita Fleet" (Mammoth Adventure 1947), "Valley of the Big Smoke" (Mammoth Adventure 1947), "Crazy Cat" (Mammoth Adventure 1947), "I Wake Up Dreaming" (Fantastic Adventures 1948), "Freddie Funk's Flippant Fairies" (Fantastic Adventures 1948), "The Dancing Dutchman" (Mammoth Western, 1948), "This Curse for You" (Amazing Stories 1951), "Who Sleeps with Angels" (Fantastic Adventures 1951). Her essays for science fiction publications were on various topics, from comets and telescopes to "ancient barbering customs", Cambodian dance, and Atlantis. She chaired the auction and registration committees at the tenth World Science Fiction Convention, known as Chicon II, in 1952.

In 1964, Frances Hamling and her husband bought a fully-furnished Arthur Elrod house in Palm Springs, California, but promised the former owner that they would not change it in any way. Rugs, appliances, even ashtrays and a candy dish were left in place for years; the house is still considered "an incredible time capsule" of mid-century modern decor.

Personal life 
Frances Ferris married twice; her first husband was writer Leroy Yerxa; they married in the 1935 and had four children together before Leroy died in 1946. She remarried in 1948, to magazine editor William Lawrence Hamling. She had two more children with Hamling; they divorced in 1967, but continued to live together for some time after that.  She was active in Palm Springs society, including the League of Women Voters. She also lived in Nampa, Idaho in her later years. She died in 2019, in Onondaga, Michigan, at the age of 101.

References

External links 

 
 Jean Marie Stine, Pink Winds, Green Cats, Radiant Rocks & Other Classics by the Forgotten Woman of Science Fiction's Golden Age (A&T Books 2005). A collection of Deegan's works.
 Eric Leif Davin, "Brief Bios: Frances Yerxa (Hamling)" Sigma 381 (December 2017).
 

Science fiction writers
American women writers
People from Eaton Rapids, Michigan
1917 births
2019 deaths
American centenarians